The Ware River is a  tidal river in the U.S. state of Virginia. It is an arm of Mobjack Bay, part of the Chesapeake Bay estuary system.

See also
List of rivers of Virginia

References

USGS Hydrologic Unit Map - State of Virginia (1974)

Rivers of Virginia